The 1959 LPGA Tour was the 10th season since the LPGA Tour officially began in 1950. The season ran from January 11 to September 26.
The season consisted of 29 official money events. Betsy Rawls won the most tournaments, 10. She also led the money list with earnings of $26,774.

There was only one first-time winner in 1959, Ruth Jessen.

The tournament results and award winners are listed below.

Tournament results
The following table shows all the official money events for the 1959 season. "Date" is the ending date of the tournament. The numbers in parentheses after the winners' names are the number of wins they had on the tour up to and including that event. Majors are shown in bold.

Awards

References

External links
LPGA Tour official site

LPGA Tour seasons
LPGA Tour